Kattila Thottila is a 1973 Indian Tamil-language drama film directed by Malliyam Rajagopal and produced by Rama Arangannal. It is a remake of the 1972 Kannada film Naa Mechida Huduga, which was based on the story Divorce In Indian Style, written by P. S. Vaidyanathan. The film stars Gemini Ganesan and P. Bhanumathi, with Kalpana, Sivakumar, Srikanth, Thengai Srinivasan and Manorama. It was released on 28 September 1973.

Plot

Cast 
 Gemini Ganesan as Sundaram
 P. Bhanumathi as Meenakshi
 Sivakumar as Sambhasivam
 Kalpana as Padmini
 Srikanth as Raja
 Thengai Srinivasan as Vasu
 Rajesh
 Manorama as Manoramai
 V. S. Raghavan as Sadhasivam
 Master Sekhar as Gopi
 Master Ramu as Ramu
 Ganthimathi as Sadhasivam's wife

Soundtrack 
Music was composed by V. Kumar and lyrics were written by Vaali.

References

External links 
 

1970s Tamil-language films
1973 films
Indian black-and-white films
Indian drama films
Tamil remakes of Kannada films